Montijo District is a district (distrito) of Veraguas Province in Panama. The population according to the 2000 census was 12,211; the latest official estimate (for 2019) is 7,060. The district covers a total area of 780 km². It includes all of the offshore islands of Coiba National Park, the largest of which are Coiba and Jicarón. The capital lies at the town of Montijo. The district includes the Gulf of Montijo and the islands in it.

Administrative divisions
Montijo District is divided administratively into the following corregimientos:

Montijo
Isla Gobernadora
La Garceana
Leones
Pilón
Cébaco
Costa Hermosa
Unión del Norte

References

External links
Coiba National Park

Districts of Panama
Veraguas Province